The Orissa Minerals Development Company Limited (OMDC), (also known as Orissa Minerals), is a Public Sector Undertaking company in the Indian states of Odisha under administrative control of Department of Steel and Mines, Government of Odisha. It was founded on August 16, 1918 and is engaged in the mining and production of iron ore and manganese ore. It is a subsidiary of state-owned Rashtriya Ispat Nigam Limited. It is listed at Calcutta Stock Exchange (CSE), National Stock Exchange of India (NSE) and Bombay Stock Exchange (BSE).

History 
OMDC was incorporated on August 16, 1918. In 1980, the company was nationalized by Government of India through the Bird & Company Limited. It became a Public Sector Undertaking in March 2010.

According to Indian Bureau of Mines approval, it had an annual production capacity of 2.20 million tons of Iron Ore and 0.1 million tons of Manganese ore.

Insolvency 
In October 2020, OMDC admitted to Corporate Insolvency Resolution Process (CIRP) under the provision of IBC, 2016. The bankruptcy case was accepted by the National Company Law Tribunal court.

Earlier in 2018, the Corporate Insolvency Resolution Process (CIRP) was initiated against the company, but the case was settled when the company paid creditors' dues.

Mines 
It operates six iron ore and manganese ore mining leases, including Dalki Manganese Mines, Kolha Roida Iron & Manganese mines, Thakurani Iron & Manganese Mines, Belkundi Iron & Manganese Mines, Bariaburu Iron Mines hand Bhadrasai Iron & Manganese Mines. The mining leases located are at Barbil in the district of Kendujhar, Odisha. As of October 2020, the mining operations of Orissa Minerals are under suspension due to non availability of statutory clearances.

See also 

 Public sector undertakings in India
 List of public sector undertakings in India

References

Government-owned companies of India
Indian companies established in 1918
Companies based in Odisha
Mining companies of India
Companies listed on the National Stock Exchange of India
Companies listed on the Bombay Stock Exchange